The 1822 Connecticut gubernatorial election was held on April 11, 1822. Incumbent governor and Toleration Party candidate Oliver Wolcott Jr. defeated former congressman and Federalist Party candidate Zephaniah Swift, winning with 86.59% of the vote.

General election

Candidates
Major candidates

Oliver Wolcott Jr., Toleration
Zephaniah Swift, Federalist

Minor candidates

Timothy Pitkin, Federalist

Results

References

1822
Connecticut
Gubernatorial